The Adventures of Massey Ferguson is a New Zealand made animated television series for young children. The characters, who live on a farm near the fictional rural town of Kumara Cove, include Massey Ferguson the tractor, Gracie the farm bike, Max Tractor the John Deere, Beaut the purple Ute, Mrs Milk the Milk Tanker, Slomo the Mobility Scooter and Rusty the Ford Model AA.

The series was created by broadcaster Jim Mora, and Brent Chambers from the production house Flux Animation.

References

New Zealand children's animated television series
Television shows funded by NZ on Air